The 1940 Cotton Bowl Classic was the fourth edition of the postseason college football bowl game, between the Clemson Tigers and the Boston College Eagles. It was played on Monday, January 1, 1940, at the Cotton Bowl in Dallas,

Background
Texas A&M, the 1939 SWC Champion, declined to be in this game, instead playing in the Sugar Bowl. Tennessee of the SEC and Oklahoma of the Big Six also declined this game. Fearing for the longevity of the game, J. Curtis Sanford strove to keep the bowl game alive, extending invites to Clemson and BC, who accepted; this was the first bowl game for both schools.

With both teams from outside the region, attendance was low; the first three editions (and next six) included a team from the state of Texas.

Lou Montgomery Controversy
The star player on the Boston College team was running back Lou Montgomery, who was the first Black student-athlete in B.C.'s history. Sportswriters used adjectives like "flashy" and "brilliant" to describe his running ability and his skill at evading anyone trying to tackle him. He was an important part of B.C.'s successful season, and very popular with the fans. But America was segregated at that time, and despite being a key part of the Eagles' offense, whenever B.C. played against southern teams, even if the game was played up north, Montgomery had been benched. And when Boston College received its invitation to the Cotton Bowl, the President of the Cotton Bowl's Athletic Association, Curtis Sanford, announced that Montgomery would not be allowed to participate, and that he had discussed this with "officials at Boston College," who agreed. Sanford asserted that keeping him out of the game was "advisable...in view of the general Texas attitude regarding Negroes." The story was reported as if Montgomery too agreed with the decision, although some fans believed he felt there was no other option but to accept it. Montgomery was praised in the major Boston newspapers for being such a good sport about not playing in the Cotton Bowl. Years later, some Boston sportswriters had second thoughts, and wondered why they hadn't protested the injustice of a star player being excluded from a bowl game because of his race, but at the time, few of the white sportswriters spoke up. Sportswriters at Black newspapers were outraged over it, however. One Boston-based reporter for the Chicago Defender accused coach Frank Leahy of giving in to Jim Crow customs and "catering to southern prejudice," charges that Leahy denied. Other Black sportswriters accused Boston College, a Catholic institution, of not living up to its own ideals, by allowing Montgomery to endure discrimination and doing nothing to defend him.  In mid-January 1940, the Boston Veterans of Foreign Wars gave Montgomery an award for "sportsmanship, citizenship, and athletic ability," and praised him for his "self-effacement."

Game summary
Boston College took the lead on a 30-yard field goal by Alex Lukachik early in the second quarter, after four failed plays following a punt return to the Clemson 13. After both teams exchanged punts throughout most of the quarter, Clemson got it back at their 43. They drove 57 yards and it culminated with a touchdown by sophomore Charlie Timmons, but the extra point was missed. The remainder of the game was scoreless as Clemson won their first bowl game, and All-American back Banks McFadden was named the game's most valuable player.

Aftermath
Boston College returned to the Cotton Bowl Classic 45 years later in 1985 and won, led by Heisman Trophy winner  Clemson returned in 2018 with a 30-3 College Football Playoff semifinal victory over Notre Dame.

The teams have been conference foes since 2005, when BC joined the Atlantic Coast Conference. Since 2008, the O'Rourke–McFadden Trophy is awarded to the winner of the annual Boston College–Clemson game, honoring Charlie O'Rourke of BC and McFadden of Clemson, leaders of their teams in the 1940 Cotton Bowl.

See also
 Boston College–Clemson football rivalry

References

Cotton Bowl Classic
Cotton Bowl Classic
Boston College Eagles football bowl games
Clemson Tigers football bowl games
January 1940 sports events
Cotton Bowl